Hazur Sahib Nanded Shri Ganganagar Junction Express is a Superfast train belonging to Indian Railways North Western Railway zone that run between  and  in India.

This train was Inaugurated on 31 May 2019 for better connectivity between these two places.

Service
This train covers the distance of 1993 km with an average speed of 57 km/h on both sides with total time of 35 hours 18 mins.

As the average speed of the train is above 55 km/hr, as per Indian Railways rules, its fare includes a Superfast surcharge.

Routes
It reverses direction at twice during its run at  & .

Traction

External links

References

Express trains in India
Rail transport in Maharashtra
Rail transport in Madhya Pradesh
Transport in Sri Ganganagar
Rail transport in Delhi
Rail transport in Haryana
Transport in Nanded
Rail transport in Punjab, India
Rail transport in Rajasthan